Drax, also known as Drax the Destroyer, is a fictional character portrayed by Dave Bautista in the Marvel Cinematic Universe (MCU) film franchise, based on the Marvel Comics character of the same name. In the films, Drax is a warrior and member of the Guardians of the Galaxy who seeks vengeance for the loss of his family. Originally he sought to avenge his family by killing Kree fanatic Ronan the Accuser, but after Ronan's death, his mission became defeating Thanos. An element of comedy to his character is a running gag that Drax takes common idioms literally, being unable to understand the concept of metaphors.

, the character has appeared in five films and The Guardians of the Galaxy Holiday Special (2022) as well as the Disney+ animated series What If...? (2021) as alternate versions, voiced by Fred Tatasciore instead of Bautista. He will return in the upcoming film Guardians of the Galaxy Vol. 3 (2023), which will be Bautista's final appearance as the character.

Concept and creation 
The comic book character, Drax the Destroyer, first appeared in The Invincible Iron Man #55 (February 1973), and was created by Jim Starlin with the help of writer Mike Friedrich. He appeared in various Marvel series, and was "killed" several times. Drax received an eponymous 4 issue miniseries in 2004, and was a starring character in Annihilation: Nova #1–4 (2005) and Annihilation #1–6 (2006). After a follow up appearance in Nova vol 4 #4–7 (2007) and the 2008 "Annihilation: Conquest" storyline, he was featured as a team member in the 2008 relaunch of Guardians of the Galaxy, and appeared in the 25 issue series of the same name. The character had a small role in The Thanos Imperative #1–3 (2010), in which he was killed. The comic book origin of the character was as the displaced soul of a human from Earth placed in a body created to seek revenge on Thanos.

Marvel Studios President Kevin Feige first mentioned Guardians of the Galaxy as a potential film at the 2010 San Diego Comic-Con International, stating, "There are some obscure titles, too, like Guardians of the Galaxy. I think they've been revamped recently in a fun way in the [comic] book." Feige reiterated that sentiment in a September 2011 issue of Entertainment Weekly, saying, "There's an opportunity to do a big space epic, which Thor sort of hints at, in the cosmic side" of the Marvel Cinematic Universe. Feige added, should the film be made, it would feature an ensemble of characters, similar to X-Men and The Avengers. Feige announced that the film was in active development at the 2012 San Diego Comic-Con International during the Marvel Studios panel, with an intended release date of August 1, 2014. He said the film's titular team would consist of the characters Star-Lord, Drax the Destroyer, Gamora, Groot, and Rocket.

In 2018, Bautista joined his castmates in support of Guardians of the Galaxy director James Gunn after his firing for old tweets joking about pedophilia and rape. Bautista declared that if Disney (parent company of Marvel Studios) did not use Gunn's script for Guardians of the Galaxy Vol. 3, he would ask to be recast, calling Gunn's firing "nauseating". Ultimately, Gunn was reinstated as director of the film in March 2019. Bautista indicated that at one point Gunn wanted to do "a Drax and Mantis film" as a spinoff, but that the concept was not pursued by Marvel.

Appearance and special effects 
Bautista's makeup took approximately four hours to apply, though it could be removed in 90 minutes. Drax has various scarring patterns on his body, which replace the simple tattoos from the comics, each having a specific story. Additionally, his skin tone was changed from the bright green in the comics to a muddier grey, to avoid visual similarities to the Hulk.

For the second film, Bautista's makeup took only 90 minutes to apply, down from four hours for the first film. He would have to sit in a sauna at the end of the day to get the makeup off, after his makeup test was found to be too "abrasive".

Fictional character biography

Origin 
Prior to 2014, Drax's homeworld was invaded by forces of Thanos under the command of Ronan the Accuser. The invaders killed Drax's family, setting him off on a path of revenge, resulting in him being captured and sent to a space prison called the Kyln.

Guardian of the Galaxy and facing Ego

In 2014, the other Guardians first encounter Drax in prison, where he has immediate hostility towards Gamora due to her connection with Thanos. Drax attacks Gamora, but Peter Quill convinces him to spare her in return for her ability to draw Ronan to her, so that Drax can exact revenge. Drax helps the Guardians escape from prison, accompanying them to Knowhere, where he argues with Rocket and then drunkenly sends a signal out to challenge Ronan to fight. Ronan arrives, easily defeats Drax, and leaves with the Power Stone. Drax regrets his actions and joins the Guardians in defending Xandar from Ronan's attack. After Ronan's ship crashes, Drax and Rocket destroy Ronan's axe holding the Power Stone, and join Quill and Gamora in controlling the stone long enough to destroy Ronan. After the Nova Corps praise the Guardians for their actions, Gamora genuinely assures Drax that his family was avenged. He accepts her advice, although he acknowledges that Ronan was merely a pawn of Thanos, whom he now seeks revenge on.

Drax and the Guardians are later hired by the Sovereign to fight off an alien attacking their valuable batteries, in exchange for retrieving Gamora's sister Nebula. After they leave, they are chased by the Sovereign fleet, as Rocket had stolen their batteries, of which Drax was aware. After crash-landing on a planet, they meet Quill's father, Ego. Drax decides to accompany Quill and Gamora to Ego's planet, while Rocket, Groot, and Nebula stay behind. On Ego's planet, they meet his assistant Mantis, with whom Drax develops a friendship though he finds her hideous. When the Guardians find out about Ego's true self, Drax joins them in fighting Ego until Quill puts a jetpack on him and sends him away with an unconscious Mantis.

Infinity War and resurrection 

In 2018, when the Guardians answer the distress call from Thor's destroyed spaceship and save Thor from floating in space, Drax accompanies Quill, Gamora, and Mantis to Knowhere to head off Thanos from gaining the Reality Stone. However, Thanos gets there first and uses the stone to briefly turn Drax into a pile of blocks. After Thanos takes Gamora and leaves, Drax reforms back into himself and accompanies Quill and Mantis to Titan, where they join with Avengers Tony Stark, Stephen Strange, and Peter Parker in an effort to defeat Thanos there, which ultimately fails due to Thanos' immense power with the partially assembled Infinity Gauntlet. Shortly after, Drax disintegrates due to the Blip.

In 2023, Drax is restored to life and is transported via a portal to Earth at the destroyed Avengers Compound to join the battle against an alternate 2014 Thanos and his army. Afterwards, Drax attends Stark's funeral, and along with the other Guardians and Thor, departs for space. Drax and the rest of the Guardians, accompanied by Thor, then return to space, where they eventually come to respond to various distress calls brought about by the killing of the gods of various worlds.

Later, after Thor goes his own way, the Guardians buy Knowhere from the Collector, and Drax helps as they work to refurbish it. When Quill is feeling depressed over the loss of his relationship with Gamora, Drax joins the Guardians in attempting to give him a meaningful Christmas by kidnapping a fictionalized in-universe version of actor Kevin Bacon as a gift for Quill. Drax and Mantis land in Hollywood, Los Angeles, inadvertently make money as buskers posing for pictures on the Hollywood Walk of Fame, and get drunk at a bar before a seller of star maps tells them where to find Kevin Bacon's house.

Characterization 

In Guardians of the Galaxy, Drax is characterized as a warrior who seeks to avenge his family's death at the hands of Ronan. On relating to the character, Bautista said, "I can just relate to Drax so much it's not even funny. Just the simple things that we have in common. Simple things like the tattoos, the tragedy—because, you know, I had a bit of tragedy in my life, as well. So it's really easy for me to pull from that." Bautista also said that there was "a lot of comic relief to Drax", but the character was not aware of it. Bautista stated that he did not do much preparation for the role, because "Luckily, for me, I'm a lifelong athlete and I adapted real quick".

In preparing for Guardians of the Galaxy Vol. 2, Bautista waited for the final version of the script so as to not take "away from the magic", which he felt had happened when he read early drafts of the first film. He added that "I wasn't crazy about my part [in Vol. 2, initially]. It went a different direction than what I thought they were going to go with Drax," noting he did not "think Drax was that significant in the film". The part "clicked" for Bautista after the table read with the other cast. Bautista called Drax "more funny, driven" than in the first film, and having "a sense of innocence and heartbreak about him", despite "most people's first perception of Drax [that] he's just a big, muscly brute".

Drax appears in "What If... T'Challa Became a Star-Lord?", an episode of What If...?, although voiced by Fred Tatasciore instead of Bautista. Bautista claimed he had not been asked to voice Drax in the series, although Marvel Studios vice-president Brad Winderbaum doubted this.

Alternate versions

Several alternate versions of Drax appear in the animated series, What If...?, where he is voiced by Fred Tatasciore.

Bartender on Contraxia 

In an alternate 2014, Drax works as a bartender on Contraxia and is an admirer of Star-Lord T'Challa, after his homeworld and family were saved by him from a Kree invasion.

Attending Thor's party

In an alternate 2011, Drax attends Thor's intergalatic party on Earth. He becomes upset when Thor calls on the partygoers to clean up their mess until Thor uses his powers to intimidate them into cleaning up while mentioning that Frigga is coming.

Ultron's conquest 

In an alternate 2015, Drax, along with the other Guardians, are killed by Ultron on Sovereign.

Powers and abilities
Drax has superhuman strength and durability, and exceptional fighting skills. In Guardians of the Galaxy Volume Two, he is dragged behind a flying spaceship as it crashes in a forest, and shows no sign of injury despite being smashed into multiple trees. In The Guardians of the Galaxy Holiday Special, he is repeatedly shot by a police officer with a handgun, which only tickles him. Afterwards, he easily flips a police car in the air and onto its back. Drax typically fights with a pair of long curved knives.

Reception 
Despite his rough exterior and tragic backstory, Drax commonly serves as comic relief, and his one-liners within the franchise have often been the subject of memes.

See also 
 Characters of the Marvel Cinematic Universe

References

External links 
 Drax on the Marvel Cinematic Universe Wiki
 
 Drax on Marvel.com

Avengers (film series)
Fictional characters displaced in time
Fictional characters with superhuman durability or invulnerability
Fictional humanoids
Fictional knife-fighters
Fictional outlaws
Fictional mercenaries
Fictional prison escapees
Film characters introduced in 2014
Guardians of the Galaxy (film series)
Guardians of the Galaxy characters
Male characters in film
Marvel Cinematic Universe characters
Marvel Comics characters with accelerated healing
Marvel Comics characters with superhuman strength
Marvel Comics extraterrestrial superheroes
Marvel Comics male superheroes
Space pirates
Superhero film characters